Beshpeltir (Beşpeltir) is a rural locality (a selo) and the administrative centre of Beshpeltirskoye Rural Settlement of Chemalsky District, the Altai Republic, Russia. The population was 480 as of 2016. There are 5 streets.

Geography 
Beshpeltir is located in the valley of the Katun River, south from Gorno-Altaysk at the confluence of the Kolbazhak and Elyunga rivers, 29 km north of Chemal (the district's administrative centre) by road. Uznezya is the nearest rural locality.

References 

Rural localities in Chemalsky District